Ewelina Staszulonek (born February 17, 1985 in Jarosław, Poland) is a Polish luger who has competed since 2003. Competing in two Winter Olympics, she earned her best finish of eighth in the women's singles event at Vancouver in 2010.

Staszulonek's best finish at the FIL World Luge Championships was 13th in the women's singles event at Lake Placid, New York in 2009. Her best finish at the FIL European Luge Championships was 14th in the women's singles event twice (2004, 2010).

References
 2006 luge women's singles results
 FIL-Luge profile
 The-sports.org profile

External links 
 
 
 

1985 births
Living people
Polish female lugers
Olympic lugers of Poland
Lugers at the 2006 Winter Olympics
Lugers at the 2010 Winter Olympics
People from Jarosław
Sportspeople from Podkarpackie Voivodeship